Kim Sun-young, Kim Seon-young or Kim Seon-yeong is a Korean name consisting of the family name Kim and the given name Sun-young, and may also refer to:

 Kim Sun-young (actress, born 1976) (born 1976), South Korean actress
 Kim Seon-young (judoka) (born 1979), South Korean judoka
 Kim Sun-young (actress, born 1980) (born 1980), South Korean actress
 Kim Seon-yeong (curler) (born 1993), South Korean curler